Songs from Bright Avenue is Bob Bennett's fifth release.  The album was made in the shadow of Bennett's divorce from his first wife. Bennett stated, "I was 'foolish' enough to make a record about my divorce. The normal [procedure] in Christian music is that if you go through a divorce, you simply go underground for a year and show up with a new spouse, and no one's the wiser. When Songs From Bright Avenue came out, I realized that this was not going to be the 'Hey-let's-buy-a-big-bag-of-Fritos-and-invite-the-gang-over' type of record. I've had people tell me that it was just too painful to listen to. I say, 'I understand that, but go back and listen and see if you can find some hope there because I certainly tried [to convey that]'."

Track listing
All songs written by Bob Bennett, except where noted.

"Here On Bright Avenue" – 4:48
"No Such Thing As Divorce" – 4:14
"Angels Around Your Bed" – 3:15
"The Doing of the Thing" – 5:14
"Our Codependent Love" – 5:21
"My Secret Heart" – 5:24
"Save Me" – 4:09
"Unto the Least of These" – 4:39
"Hope Like a Stranger" – 3:56
"The Place I Am Bound" – 4:26
"Singing For My Life" – 3:32
"I'm Still Alive Tonight" – 2:23

Personnel
 Bob Bennett – acoustic guitar, vocals, composer 
 Breg Jennings (2, 10) – acoustic guitar
 Dan Foster (10) – tin whistle
 Danny O'Lannerghty (5) – electric bass, acoustic bass, rhythm charts
 David Wilcox (3, 9, 11) – background vocals
 Gene Elders (2,10) – fiddle
 Gordon Garrison – sound engineer 
 Greg Jennings (1, 4) – electric guitar
 Jimmy Mattingly (8) – fiddle, mandolin
 Jonathan David Brown – producer, recording, mixing
 Kelly Willard (7, 11) – background vocals
 Larry Seyer (1, 3, 6, 7, 9, 11) – electric guitar
 Lisa Glasgow (7, 11) – background vocals
 Mark Hammond (5, 7, 9) – drums, percussion 
 Marvin Steinberg (6) – drums, percussion
 Michael Card (8) – background vocals
 Pally O'Malley (5) – electric and acoustic bass
 Paul Glasse (3, 10) – mandolin
 Paul Leim (1, 2, 4, 8, 10, 11) – drums and percussion 
 Phil Keaggy (4) – electric guitar, acoustic guitar, background vocals
Phil Madeira (5) — piano (and for the only keyboard on this record: "Phil Madeira, ladies and gentlemen, on the ivories! Phil...")

Release history
Songs from Bright Avenue was released by Urgent Records in 1991. It was re-released by Signpost Music in 2003.

References

Bob Bennett (singer-songwriter) albums
1991 albums